The 2018 IBSF Junior & U23 World Championships took place at the St. Moritz-Celerina Olympic Bobrun in St.Moritz, Switzerland, from 25 to 28 January 2018.

Schedule
Six events were held.

All times are local (UTC+1).

Medal summary

Medal table

Bobsleigh

Junior

Under-23

Skeleton

References

International sports competitions hosted by Switzerland
IBSF Junior & U23 World Championships
IBSF Junior & U23 World Championships
IBSF Junior & U23 World Championships
IBSF Junior & U23 World Championships
Bobsleigh in Switzerland
Skeleton in Switzerland
IBSF Junior & U23 World Championships